Andrey Ivanovich Zazroyev (Zazroshvili) (21 October 1925 – 10 September 1986) was a Soviet and Georgian football player and manager.

Zazroyev was born in Tbilisi. He played for Dynamo Tbilisi, Krylya Sovetov Perm and Dynamo Kyiv as forward. After finishing his playing career he became a successful manager who coached Dynamo Tbilisi, Spartak Ordzhonikidze, Dila Gori and Spartak Tbilisi.

Honours

As player 
Soviet Top League
 runner-up: 1951, 1952
 3rd place: 1950
Soviet Cup
 winner: 1954

As manager 
 1969 Soviet First League with Spartak Ordzhonikidze

External links
 Career summary by KLISF

1925 births
1986 deaths
Footballers from Tbilisi
Soviet footballers
Russian footballers
FC Spartak Vladikavkaz players
FC Dinamo Tbilisi players
FC Dynamo Kyiv players
Soviet Top League players
Soviet football managers
Russian football managers
FC Spartak Vladikavkaz managers
CSKA Pamir Dushanbe managers
Association football midfielders
FC Zvezda Perm players